K-1 World MAX 2003 World Tournament Final was a kickboxing event promoted by the K-1 organization.  It was the second ever K-1 MAX final for middleweight kickboxers (70 kg/154 lb weight class) involving eight finalists and two reserve fighters, with all bouts fought under K-1 rules.  The tournament fighters had qualified via preliminary tournaments, had been involved in the previous years final, or had been invited due to their achievements in kickboxing and Muay Thai (more information on the fighters is detailed by the bulleted list below).  As well as tournament bouts there was also a super fight, also fought under K-1 rules.  In total there were twelve fighters at the event, representing seven countries.

The tournament winner was the home favourite Masato who defeated reigning champion Albert Kraus by knockout, in what was a very entertaining event with five stoppages in the eight bouts.  Both Masato and Kraus had challenging routes to the final with Masato having a close decision victory over Mike Zambidis and Kraus overcoming up and comer and future K-1 MAX champion Andy Souwer in the quarter finals.  The event was held in Saitama at the Saitama Super Arena, on Saturday, 5 July 2003.

Finalists
 Marfio Canoletti - K-1 MAX Brazil 2002 champion, W.K.N. Brazil Muay Thai champion
 Albert Kraus - reigning K-1 World MAX 2002 champion, W.K.A. world champion '01
 Duane Ludwig - invitee, K-1 MAX USA 2002 champion, x2 I.K.F. U.S.A. national Muay Thai amateur champion
 Masato - K-1 MAX Japan 2003 champion,  I.S.K.A. oriental rules welterweight world champion '00, A.J.K.F welterweight champion '99
 Sakeddaw Kiatputon - invitee, Rajadamnern Stadium champion 
 Andy Souwer - S-Cup 2002 champion, multiple Muay Thai and kickboxing world champion
 Kozo Takeda - K-1 MAX Japan 2003 runner up, former Rajadamnern Stadium champion
 Mike Zambidis - K-1 Oceania MAX 2002 champion, multiple world champion (Kings of the Ring, W.O.K.A) 

Reservists
 Yasuhiro Kazuya - K-1 MAX Japan 2003 3rd place, national karate champion
 Viatcheslav Nesterov - invitee, Kyokushin Karate Oyama Cup 3rd place

K-1 World MAX 2003 World Tournament Final

Results

See also
List of K-1 events
List of K-1 champions
List of male kickboxers

References

External links
K-1 Official Website
K-1sport.de - Your Source for Everything K-1

K-1 MAX events
2003 in kickboxing
Kickboxing in Japan
Sport in Saitama (city)